Mauritania, a country in the western region of the continent of Africa, is generally flat, its 1,030,700 square kilometres forming vast, arid plains broken by occasional ridges and clifflike outcroppings. It borders the North Atlantic Ocean, between Senegal and Western Sahara, Mali and Algeria. It is considered part of both the Sahel and the Maghreb. A series of scarps face southwest, longitudinally bisecting these plains in the center of the country. Spring-fed oases lie at the foot of some of the scarps. Isolated peaks, often rich in minerals, rise above the plateaus; the smaller peaks are called Guelbs and the larger ones Kedias. The concentric Guelb er Richat is a prominent feature of the north-central region.

Approximately three-fourths of Mauritania is desert or semidesert. As a result of extended, severe drought, the desert has been expanding since the mid-1960s. The plateaus gradually descend toward the northeast to the barren El Djouf, or "Empty Quarter," a vast region of large sand dunes that merges into the Sahara Desert. To the west, between the ocean and the plateaus, are alternating areas of clayey plains (regs) and sand dunes (ergs), some of which shift from place to place, gradually moved by high winds. The dunes generally increase in size and mobility toward the north.

Belts of natural vegetation, corresponding to the rainfall pattern, extend from east to west and range from traces of tropical forest along the Sénégal River to brush and savanna in the southeast. Only sandy desert is found in the centre and north of the country.

Climate
The climate is characterized by extremes in temperature and by meager and irregular rainfall. Annual temperature variations are small, although diurnal variations can be extreme. The harmattan, a hot, dry, and often dust-laden wind, blows from the Sahara throughout the long dry season and is the prevailing wind, except along the narrow coastal strip, which is influenced by oceanic trade winds.

Major geographic and climate zones

Mauritania has four ecological zones: the Saharan Zone, the Sahelian Zone, the Senegal River Valley, and the Coastal Zone. Although the zones are markedly different from one another, no natural features clearly delineate the boundaries between them. Sand, varying in color and composition, covers 40 percent of the surface of the country, forming dunes that appear in all zones except the Senegal River Valley. Fixed sand dunes are composed of coarse, fawn-colored sand, while shifting ("mobile") dunes consist of fine, dustlike, reddish-colored sands that can be carried by the wind. Plateaus generally are covered with heavier blue, gray, and black sands that form a crusty surface over layers of soft, loose sand.

Saharan zone

The Saharan Zone makes up the northern two-thirds of the country. Rain usually falls during the hivernage, which lasts from July to September. Often, isolated storms drop large amounts of water in short periods of time. A year, or even several years, may pass without any rain in some locations.

Diurnal variations in temperature in the Saharan Zone may be extreme, although annual variations are minimal. Throughout the year, the harmattan often causes blinding sandstorms.

The administrative regions (formerly called cercles) of Tiris Zemmour in the north, Adrar in the center, and northern Hodh ech Chargui in the east, which make up most of the Saharan Zone, are vast empty stretches of dunes alternating with granite outcroppings. After a rain, or in the presence of a well, these outcroppings may support vegetation. In the populated Adrar and Tagant plateaus, springs and wells provide water for pasturage and some agriculture. In the western portion of the Saharan Zone, extending toward Nouakchott, rows of sand dunes are aligned from northeast to southwest in ridges from two to twenty kilometres wide. Between these ridges are depressions filled with limestone and clayey sand capable of supporting vegetation after a rain. Dunes in the far north shift with the wind more than those in the south.

The Saharan Zone has little vegetation. Some mountainous areas with a water source support small-leafed and spiny plants and scrub grasses suitable for camels. Because seeds of desert plants can remain dormant for many years, dunes often sprout sparse vegetation after a rain. In depressions between dunes, where the water is nearer the surface, some flora—including acacias, soapberry trees, capers, and swallowwort—may be found. Saline areas have a particular kind of vegetation, mainly chenopods, which are adapted to high salt concentrations in the soil. Cultivation is limited to oases, where date palms are used to shade other crops from the sun.

Sahelian zone
The Sahelian Zone extends south of the Saharan Zone to within approximately 30 kilometres of the Senegal River. It forms an east–west belt with its axis running from Boutilimit through 'Ayoûn el 'Atroûs to Néma, including the Aoukar basin. The area is mostly made up of steppes and savanna grasslands. Herds of cattle, sheep, and goats move across this zone in search of pasturage.

The hivernage begins earlier in the Sahelian Zone than in the Saharan Zone, often lasting from June until October. Because farmers and herders depend on annual rains, a delay of one month in the beginning of the rainy season can cause large losses and lead to mass migrations from Hodh ech Chargui and Hodh el Gharbi into Mali. The harmattan is the prevailing wind.

In the northern Sahel, dunes are covered with scrub grasses and spiny acacia trees. Farther south, greater rainfall permits denser vegetation. Sands begin to give way to clay. Large date palm plantations are found on the Tagant Plateau, and savanna grasses, brushwood, balsam, and spurge cover fixed dunes. Occasional baobab trees dot the flat savanna grasslands of the southern Sahel. Forest areas contain palm trees and baobabs. Vast forests of gum-bearing acacia grow in Trarza and Brakna regions. Farther south, particularly in Assaba and the northern portion of Guidimaka regions, rainfall is high enough to support forms of sedentary agriculture.

Senegal River Valley
The Senegal River Valley, sometimes known as the Chemama or the pre-Sahel, is a narrow belt of land that extends north of the Senegal River. By the late 1980s, desertification had reached the northern bank of the river in some parts of the valley. The valley is wider in Guidimaka Region and is completely dominated by the seasonal cycle of the river. Almost all of the valley's economically active population engages in sedentary agriculture or fishing along the Senegal River and its main tributaries—the Karakoro, the Gorgol, and the Garfa. This area supplies most of the country's agricultural production.

The climate of the Senegal River Valley contrasts with that of the Saharan and Sahelian zones. Rainfall is higher than in other regions, ranging from  annually, usually between May and September. This rainfall, combined with annual flooding of the river, provides the basis for agriculture. Temperatures are cooler and subject to less annual and diurnal variation than in other regions.

The Senegal is the only permanent river between southern Morocco and central Senegal. From its source in Guinea, it flows north and west , reaching the Atlantic Ocean at Saint Louis, Senegal. From its mouth, the river is navigable as far as Kayes, Mali, during the rainy season and Podor, Senegal, during the rest of the year. Heavy rains, beginning in April in Guinea and May and June in Senegal and Mali, bring annual floods. A notable example of these is Lake R'Kiz. When the waters recede from the bottomlands, planting begins.

The Senegal River Valley, with its rich alluvial and clayey soil, is comparatively abundant in flora. Moreover, higher rainfall, irrigation, and abundant side channels and sloughs tend to produce a lush, near-tropical vegetation, with baobab and gonakie trees and abundant rich grasses. Ddounm and barussus palms are also found here. Much of the flood plain is cultivated.

Coastal zone
Prevailing oceanic trade winds from the Canary Islands modify the influence of the harmattan, producing a humid but temperate climate. Rainfall here is minimal; in Nouadhibou it averages 30  mm annually and occurs between July and September.

Battering surf and shifting sand banks characterize the entire length of the shoreline. The peninsula is administratively divided between Western Sahara and Mauritania, with the Mauritanian port and railhead of Nouadhibou located on the eastern shore. Fifty kilometres southeast of Ras Nouadhibou is Arguin. In 1455 the first Portuguese installation south of Cape Bojador (in the present-day Western Sahara) was established at Arguin. Farther south is the coastline's only significant promontory, -high Cape Timiris. From this cape to the marshy area around the mouth of the Senegal River, the coast is regular and marked only by an occasional high dune.

On coastal dunes vegetation is rare. At the foot of ridges, however, large tamarisk bushes, dwarf acacias, and swallowworts may be found. Some high grass, mixed with balsam, spurge, and spiny shrubs, grows in the central region. The north has little vegetation.

A recent global remote sensing analysis suggested that there were 494km² of tidal flats in Mauritania, making it the 48th ranked country in terms of tidal flat area.

Expansion of the desert

The climate has altered drastically since the onset of the prolonged drought in the 1960s, part of a recurrent pattern of wet and dry cycles common to Sahelian Africa. Experts agree, however, that overgrazing, deforestation, denuding of ground cover around wells, poor farming methods, and overpopulation have aggravated the drought. In Mauritania the isohyet indicating annual rainfall of 150 millimetres—considered the minimum for pastoralism—has shifted southward about 100 kilometres to a point well south of Nouakchott. During the 1980s, the desert was advancing southward at an estimated rate of six kilometres a year. Each major climatic zone had shifted southward, and in some cases near-desert conditions had reached the banks of the Senegal River.

By the late 1980s, desertification had fundamentally altered agro-pastoral and human settlement patterns. Loss of ground cover in the Sahelian Zone had driven animals and people southward in search of food and water and had given rise to new fields of sand dunes. The advancing dunes threatened to engulf wells, villages, and roads; they had even invaded Nouakchott on their march to the sea. The government secured international help to stabilize the dune field around Nouakchott and planted 250,000 palm trees to create a barrier against the encroaching desert. To further combat desiccation, the government constructed dams on the Senegal River and its tributaries to increase the amount of cultivable land.

Area and boundaries

Area
total:

land:

water:

Land boundaries
total:

border countries:
Algeria , Mali , Senegal , Western Sahara

Coastline

Maritime claims
territorial sea:

contiguous zone:

continental shelf:
 or to the edge of the continental margin
exclusive economic zone:

Elevation extremes
lowest point:
Sebkha de Ndrhamcha 
highest point:
Kediet ej Jill

Resources and Land use

Natural resources
iron ore, gypsum, copper, phosphate, diamonds, gold, oil, fish

Land use
arable land:
0.44%
permanent crops:
0.01%
other:
99.55% (2011)

Irrigated land
450.1 km² (2004)

Total renewable water resources
11.4 km3

Environmental concerns

Natural hazards
hot, dry, dust/sand-laden sirocco wind blows primarily in March and April; periodic droughts

Environment – current issues
overgrazing, deforestation, and soil erosion aggravated by drought are contributing to desertification; very limited natural fresh water resources away from the Senegal which is the only perennial river; locust infestation

Environment – international agreements
party to:
Biodiversity, Climate Change, Climate Change-Kyoto Protocol, Desertification, Endangered Species, Hazardous Wastes, Law of the Sea, Ozone Layer Protection, Ship Pollution, Wetlands, Whaling
signed, but not ratified:
none of the selected agreements

Cities

The population is mainly concentrated in the cities of Nouakchott and Nouadhibou and along the Senegal River at the southern border of the country.

Extreme points
This is a list of the extreme points of Mauritania, the points that are farther north, south, east or west than any other location.

 Northernmost point – the tripoint with Algeria and Western Sahara, Tiris Zemmour Region
 Easternmost point – the tripoint with Algeria and Mali, Tiris Zemmour Region
 Southernmost point – the confluence of the Senegal River and the Karakoro River on the border with Mali, Guidimaka Region
 Westernmost point – unnamed location on the border with Western Sahara on the Ras Nouadhibou, peninsula, Dakhlet Nouadhibou Region

References

External links
Map